The automatic identification system (AIS) is an automatic tracking system that uses transceivers on ships and is used by vessel traffic services (VTS). When satellites are used to receive AIS signatures, the term Satellite-AIS (S-AIS) is used.  AIS information supplements marine radar, which continues to be the primary method of collision avoidance for water transport. Although technically and operationally distinct, the ADS-B system is analogous to AIS and performs a similar function for aircraft.

Information provided by AIS equipment, such as unique identification, position, course, and speed, can be displayed on a screen or an electronic chart display and information system (ECDIS). AIS is intended to assist a vessel's watchstanding officers and allow maritime authorities to track and monitor vessel movements. AIS integrates a standardized VHF transceiver with a positioning system such as a Global Positioning System receiver, with other electronic navigation sensors, such as a gyrocompass or rate of turn indicator. Vessels fitted with AIS transceivers can be tracked by AIS base stations located along coast lines or, when out of range of terrestrial networks, through a growing number of satellites that are fitted with special AIS receivers which are capable of deconflicting a large number of signatures.

For a variety of reasons, ships can turn off their AIS transceivers.

Viewing and using AIS data
AIS is intended, primarily, to allow ships to view marine traffic in their area and to be seen by that traffic. This requires a dedicated VHF AIS transceiver that allows local traffic to be viewed on an AIS enabled chartplotter or computer monitor while transmitting information about the ship itself to other AIS receivers.  Port authorities or other shore-based facilities may be equipped with receivers only, so that they can view the local traffic without the need to transmit their own location.  All AIS transceivers equipped traffic can be viewed this way very reliably but is limited to the VHF range, about 10–20 nautical miles.

If a suitable chartplotter is not available, local area AIS transceiver signals may be viewed via a computer using one of several computer applications such as ShipPlotter, GNU AIS or OpenCPN.  These demodulate the signal from a modified marine VHF radiotelephone tuned to the AIS frequencies and convert into a digital format that the computer can read and display on a monitor; this data may then be shared via a local or wide area network via TCP or UDP protocols but will still be limited to the collective range of the radio receivers used in the network.
Because computer AIS monitoring applications and normal VHF radio transceivers do not possess AIS transceivers, they may be used by shore-based facilities that have no need to transmit or as an inexpensive alternative to a dedicated AIS device for smaller vessels to view local traffic but, of course, the user will remain unseen by other traffic on the network.

A secondary, unplanned and emerging use for AIS data is to make it viewable publicly, on the internet, without the need for an AIS receiver.  Global AIS transceiver data collected from both satellite and internet-connected shore-based stations are aggregated and made available on the internet through a number of service providers.  Data aggregated this way can be viewed on any internet-capable device to provide near global, real-time position data from anywhere in the world. Typical data includes vessel name, details, location, speed and heading on a map, is searchable, has potentially unlimited, global range and the history is archived.  Most of this data is free of charge but satellite data and special services such as searching the archives are usually supplied at a cost.  The data is a read-only view and the users will not be seen on the AIS network itself.
Shore-based AIS receivers contributing to the internet are mostly run by a large number of volunteers. AIS mobile apps are also readily available for use with Android, Windows and iOS devices.  See External links below for a list of internet-based AIS service providers.  Ship owners and cargo dispatchers use these services to find and track vessels and their cargoes while marine enthusiasts may add to their photograph collections.

Deployment history
At the simplest level, AIS operates between pairs of radio transceivers, one of which is always on a vessel. The other may be on a vessel, on-shore (terrestrial), or on a satellite. Respectively, these represent ship to ship, ship to shore, and ship to satellite operation and follow in that order.

Vessel-based AIS transceivers
The 2002 IMO SOLAS Agreement included a mandate that required most vessels over 300GT on international voyages to fit a Class A type AIS transceiver. This was the first mandate for the use of AIS equipment and affected approximately 100,000 vessels.

In 2006, the AIS standards committee published the Class B type AIS transceiver specification, designed to enable a simpler and lower-cost AIS device. Low-cost Class B transceivers became available in the same year triggering mandate adoptions by numerous countries and making large-scale installation of AIS devices on vessels of all sizes commercially viable. 

Since 2006, the AIS technical standard committees have continued to evolve the AIS standard and product types to cover a wide range of applications from the largest vessel to small fishing vessels and life boats. In parallel, governments and authorities have instigated projects to fit varying classes of vessels with an AIS device to improve safety and security. Most mandates are focused on commercial vessels, with leisure vessels selectively choosing to fit. In 2010 most commercial vessels operating on the European Inland Waterways were required to fit an Inland waterway certified Class A, all EU fishing boats over 15m must have a Class A by May 2014, and the US has a long-pending extension to their existing AIS fit rules which is expected to come into force during 2013.  It is estimated that as of 2012, some 250,000 vessels have fitted an AIS transceiver of some type, with a further 1 million required to do so in the near future and even larger projects under consideration. 1

Terrestrial-based AIS (T-AIS)
AIS was developed in the 1990s as a high intensity, short-range identification and tracking network. Approximate line-of-sight propagation limitations mean that terrestrial AIS (T-AIS) is lost beyond coastal waters.
  In addition to port and maritime authority operated transceivers, there is large network of privately owned ones as well.

Satellite-based AIS (S-AIS)
In the 1990s AIS was not anticipated to be detectable from space. Nevertheless, since 2005, various entities have been experimenting with detecting AIS transmissions using satellite-based receivers and, since 2008, companies such as exactEarth, ORBCOMM, Spacequest, Spire and also government programs have deployed AIS receivers on satellites. The time-division multiple access (TDMA) radio access scheme used by the AIS system creates significant technical issues for the reliable reception of AIS messages from all types of transceivers: Class A, Class B, Identifier, AtoN and SART. However, the industry is seeking to address these issues through the development of new technologies and over the coming years the current restriction of satellite AIS systems to Class A messages is likely to dramatically improve with the addition of Class B and Identifier messages.

The fundamental challenge for AIS satellite operators is the ability to receive very large numbers of AIS messages simultaneously from a satellite's large reception footprint. There is an inherent issue within the AIS standard; the TDMA radio access scheme defined in the AIS standard creates 4,500 available time-slots in each minute but this can be easily overwhelmed by the large satellite reception footprints and the increasing numbers of AIS transceivers, resulting in message collisions, which the satellite receiver cannot process.  Companies such as exactEarth are developing new technologies such as ABSEA, that will be embedded within terrestrial and satellite-based transceivers, which will assist the reliable detection of Class B messages from space without affecting the performance of terrestrial AIS.

The addition of satellite-based Class A and B messages could enable truly global AIS coverage but, because the satellite-based TDMA limitations will never match the reception performance of the terrestrial-based network, satellites will augment rather than replace the terrestrial system.

AIS has much longer vertical (than horizontal) transmission – up to the 400 km orbit of the International Space Station (ISS).

In November 2009, the STS-129 space shuttle mission attached two antennas—an AIS VHF antenna, and an Amateur Radio antenna—to the Columbus module of the ISS. Both antennas were built in cooperation between ESA and the ARISS team (Amateur Radio on ISS). Starting from May 2010 the European Space Agency is testing an AIS receiver from Kongsberg Seatex (Norway) in a consortium led by the Norwegian Defence Research Establishment in the frame of technology demonstration for space-based ship monitoring. This is a first step towards a satellite-based AIS-monitoring service.

In 2009, ORBCOMM launched AIS enabled satellites in conjunction with a US Coast Guard contract to demonstrate the ability to collect AIS messages from space. In 2009, Luxspace, a Luxembourg-based company, launched the RUBIN-9.1 satellite (AIS Pathfinder 2). The satellite is operated in cooperation with SES and REDU Space Services. In late 2011 and early 2012, ORBCOMM and Luxspace launched the Vesselsat AIS microsatellites, one in an equatorial orbit and the other in a polar orbit (VesselSat-2 and VesselSat-1).

In 2007, the U.S. tested space-based AIS tracking with the TacSat-2 satellite. However, the received signals were corrupted because of the simultaneous receipt of many signals from the satellite footprint.

In July 2009, SpaceQuest launched AprizeSat-3 and AprizeSat-4 with AIS receivers. These receivers were successfully able to receive the U.S. Coast Guard's SART test beacons off of Hawaii in 2010. In July 2010, SpaceQuest and exactEarth of Canada announced an arrangement whereby data from AprizeSat-3 and AprizeSat-4 would be incorporated into the exactEarth system and made available worldwide as part of their exactAIS(TM)service.

On July 12, 2010, the Norwegian AISSat-1 satellite was successfully launched into polar orbit. The purpose of the satellite is to improve surveillance of maritime activities in the High North. AISSat-1 is a nano-satellite, measuring only 20×20×20 cm, with an AIS receiver made by Kongsberg Seatex. It weighs 6 kilograms and is shaped like a cube.

On 20 April 2011, Indian Space Research Organisation launched Resourcesat-2 containing a S-AIS payload for monitoring maritime traffic in the Indian Ocean Search & Rescue (SAR) zone. AIS data is processed at National Remote Sensing Centre and archived at Indian Space Science Data Centre.

On February 25, 2013—after one year launch delay—Aalborg University  launched AAUSAT3. It is a 1U cubesat, weights 800 grams, solely developed by students from the Department of Electronic Systems. It carries two AIS receivers—a traditional and a SDR-based receiver. The project was proposed and sponsored by the Danish Maritime Safety Administration. It has been a huge success and has in the first 100 days downloaded more than 800,000 AIS messages and several 1 MHz raw samples of radio signals. It receives both AIS channels simultaneously and has received class A as well as class B messages. Cost including launch was less than €200,000.

Canadian-based exactEarth's AIS satellite network provides global coverage using 8 satellites. Between January 2017 and January 2019, this network was significantly expanded through a partnership with L3Harris Corporation with 58 hosted payloads on the Iridium NEXT constellation. Additionally exactEarth is involved in the development of ABSEA technology which will enable its network to reliably detect a high proportion of Class B type messages, as well as Class A.

ORBCOMM operates a global satellite network that includes 18 AIS-enabled satellites. ORBCOMM's OG2 (ORBCOMM Generation 2) satellites are equipped with an Automatic Identification System (AIS) payload to receive and report transmissions from AIS-equipped vessels for ship tracking and other maritime navigational and safety efforts, and download at ORBCOMM's sixteen existing earth stations around the globe.

In July 2014, ORBCOMM launched the first 6 OG2 satellites aboard a SpaceX Falcon 9 rocket from Cape Canaveral, Florida. Each OG2 satellite carries an AIS receiver payload. All 6 OG2 satellites were successfully deployed into orbit and started sending telemetry to ORBCOMM soon after launch. In December 2015, the company launched 11 additional AIS-enabled OG2 satellites aboard the SpaceX Falcon 9 rocket. This dedicated launch marked ORBCOMM's second and final OG2 mission to complete its next-generation satellite constellation. Compared to its current OG1 satellites, ORBCOMM's OG2 satellites are designed for faster message delivery, larger message sizes and better coverage at higher latitudes, while increasing network capacity.

In August 2017, Spire Global Inc. released an API that delivers S-AIS data enhanced with machine learning (Vessels and Predict) backed by its 40+ constellation of nano-satellites.

Correlation of data sources
Correlating optical and radar imagery with S-AIS signatures enables the end-user to rapidly identify all types of vessel. A great strength of S-AIS is the ease with which it can be correlated with additional information from other sources such as radar, optical, ESM, and more SAR related tools such as GMDSS SARSAT and AMVER. Satellite-based radar and other sources can contribute to maritime surveillance by detecting all vessels in specific maritime areas of interest, a particularly useful attribute when trying to co-ordinate a long-range rescue effort or when dealing with VTS issues.

VHF Data Exchange System

Due to its growing use over time, in some coastal areas—e.g., the Singapore Strait, China's megaports, parts of Japan—there are so many vessels that the performance of AIS has been affected. As traffic density goes up, the system's range goes down, and the frequency of updates becomes more random. For this reason VHF Data Exchange System (VDES) has been developed: it will operate on additional new frequencies and will use them more efficiently, enabling thirty-two times as much bandwidth for secure communications and e-navigation. VDES is defined in ITU M.2092.

Applications

The original purpose of AIS was solely collision avoidance but many other applications have since developed and continue to be developed.  AIS is currently used for:
 Collision avoidance AIS was developed by the IMO technical committees as a technology to avoid collisions among large vessels at sea that are not within range of shore-based systems. The technology identifies every vessel individually, along with its specific position and movements, enabling a virtual picture to be created in real time. The AIS standards include a variety of automatic calculations based on these position reports such as Closest Point of Approach (CPA) and collision alarms. As AIS is not used by all vessels, AIS is usually used in conjunction with radar. When a ship is navigating at sea, information about the movement and identity of other ships in the vicinity is critical for navigators to make decisions to avoid collision with other ships and dangers (shoal or rocks). Visual observation (e.g., unaided, binoculars, and night vision), audio exchanges (e.g., whistle, horns, and VHF radio), and radar or automatic radar plotting aid are historically used for this purpose. These preventive mechanisms sometimes fail due to time delays, radar limitations, miscalculations, and display malfunctions, and can result in a collision. While requirements of AIS are to display only very basic text information, the data obtained can be integrated with a graphical electronic chart or a radar display, providing consolidated navigational information on a single display.
 Fishing fleet monitoring and control AIS is widely used by national authorities to track and monitor the activities of their national fishing fleets.
 Maritime security AIS enables authorities to identify specific vessels and their activity within or near a nation's Exclusive Economic Zone. When AIS data is fused with existing radar systems, authorities are able to differentiate between vessels more easily. AIS data can be automatically processed to create normalized activity patterns for individual vessels, which when breached, create an alert, thus highlighting potential threats for more efficient use of security assets. AIS improves maritime domain awareness and allows for heightened security and control. Additionally, AIS can be applied to freshwater river systems and lakes.
 Aids to navigation The AIS aids to navigation (AtoN) product standard was developed with the ability to broadcast the positions and names of objects other than vessels, such as navigational aid and marker positions and dynamic data reflecting the marker's environment (e.g., currents and climatic conditions). These aids can be located on shore, such as in a lighthouse, or on water, platforms, or buoys. The U.S. Coast Guard has suggested that AIS might replace racon (radar beacons) currently used for electronic navigation aids. AtoNs enable authorities to remotely monitor the status of a buoy, such as the status of the lantern, as well as transmit live data from sensors (such as weather and sea state) located on the buoy back to vessels fitted with AIS transceivers or local authorities. An AtoN will broadcast its position and Identity along with all the other information. The AtoN standard also permits the transmit of 'Virtual AtoN' positions whereby a single device may transmit messages with a 'false' position such that an AtoN marker appears on electronic charts, although a physical AtoN may not be present at that location.
 Search and rescue For coordinating on-scene resources of a marine search and rescue (SAR) operation, it is imperative to have data on the position and navigation status of other ships in the vicinity. In such cases, AIS can provide additional information and enhance awareness of available resources, even if the AIS range is limited to VHF radio range. The AIS standard also envisioned the possible use on SAR aircraft, and included a message (AIS Message 9) for aircraft to report their position. To aid SAR vessels and aircraft in locating people in distress, the specification (IEC 61097-14 Ed 1.0) for an AIS-based SAR transmitter (AIS-SART) was developed by the IEC's TC80 AIS work group. AIS-SART was added to Global Maritime Distress Safety System regulations effective January 1, 2010. AIS-SARTs have been available on the market since at least 2009. Recent regulations have mandated the installation of AIS systems on all Safety Of Life At Sea (SOLAS) vessels and vessels over 300 tons.
 Accident investigation AIS information received by VTS is important for accident investigation since it provides accurate historical data on time, identity, GPS-based position, compass heading, course over ground, speed (by log/SOG), and rates of turn, rather than the less accurate information provided by radar. A more complete picture of the events could be obtained by Voyage Data Recorder (VDR) data if available and maintained on board for details of the movement of the ship, voice communication and radar pictures during the accidents. However, VDR data are not maintained due to the limited twelve hours storage by IMO requirement.
 Ocean currents estimates Ocean surface current estimates based on the analysis of AIS data have been available from French company, e-Odyn, since December 2015.
 Infrastructure protection AIS information can be used by owners of marine seabed infrastructure, such as cables or pipelines, to monitor the activities of vessels close to their assets in close to real time.  This information can then be used to trigger alerts to inform the owner and potentially avoid an incident where damage to the asset might occur.
 Fleet and cargo tracking Internet disseminated AIS can be used by fleet or ship managers to keep track of the global location of their ships.  Cargo dispatchers, or the owners of goods in transit can track the progress of cargo and anticipate arrival times in port.
 Statistics and economics the United Nations Statistics Division organized the AIS Data Week to experiment with AIS data analysis and provide statistics to the UN Global Platform. It covered a number of use case studies by various statistical offices, and the AIS Handbook was developed to capture the experience from this experimentation:
Faster economic indicators: Time in port and port traffic
Maritime indicators
Official Maritime statistics: Port visits
Completing statistics on Inland waterways
Mapping fishery activities
Ships in distress
Greenhouse gas emissions of ships (and  calculation)
Nowcasting of Trade Flows in Real-Time
Experimental Statistics of Daily number of vessels
Real-Time Data on Seaborne Dry Bulk Commodities

Mechanism

Basic overview
AIS transceivers automatically broadcast information, such as their position, speed, and navigational status, at regular intervals via a VHF transmitter built into the transceiver. The information originates from the ship's navigational sensors, typically its global navigation satellite system (GNSS) receiver and gyrocompass. Other information, such as the vessel name and VHF call sign, is programmed when installing the equipment and is also transmitted regularly.  The signals are received by AIS transceivers fitted on other ships or on land based systems, such as VTS systems.  The received information can be displayed on a screen or chart plotter, showing the other vessels' positions in much the same manner as a radar display. Data is transmitted via a tracking system which makes use of a self-organized time-division multiple access (SOTDMA) datalink designed by Swedish inventor Håkan Lans.

The AIS standard comprises several substandards called "types" that specify individual product types. The specification for each product type provides a detailed technical specification which ensures the overall integrity of the global AIS system within which all the product types must operate. The major product types described in the AIS system standards are:

 Class A Vessel-mounted AIS transceiver which operates using SOTDMA. Targeted at large commercial vessels, SOTDMA requires a transceiver to maintain a constantly updated slot map in its memory such that it has prior knowledge of slots which are available for it to transmit. SOTDMA transceivers will then pre-announce their transmission, effectively reserving their transmit slot. SOTDMA transmissions are therefore prioritised within the AIS system. This is achieved through 2 receivers in continuous operation. Class A's must have an integrated display, transmit at 12.5 W, interface capability with multiple ship systems, and offer a sophisticated selection of features and functions. Default transmit rate is every few seconds. AIS Class A type compliant devices receive all types of AIS messages.
 Class B There are now two separate IMO specifications for Class B transceivers (aimed at lighter commercial and leisure markets): a carrier-sense time-division multiple-access (CSTDMA) system, and a system that uses SOTDMA (as in Class A). In the original CSTDMA-based system, defined in ITU M.1371-0 and now called Class B "CS" (or unofficially as Class B/CS), transceivers listen to the slot map immediately prior to transmitting and seek a slot where the 'noise' in the slot is the same (or similar) to background noise, thereby indicating that the slot is not being used by another AIS device.  Class B "CS" transmits at 2 W and is not required to have an integrated display: Class B "CS" units can be connected to most display systems where the received messages will be displayed in lists or overlaid on charts. Default transmit rate is normally every thirty seconds, but this can be varied according to vessel speed or instructions from base stations. The Class B "CS" standard requires integrated GPS and certain LED indicators. Class B "CS" equipment receives all types of AIS messages. The newer SOTDMA Class B "SO" system, sometimes referred to as Class B/SO or Class B+, leverages the same time slot finding algorithm as Class A, and has the same transmission priority as Class A transmitters, helping to guarantee that it will always be able to transmit. The Class B "SO" technology will also change its rate of transmission depending on the speed the vessel is going, up to every five seconds over 23 knots, instead of the constant rate of every thirty seconds in Class B "CS". Finally Class B "SO" will also broadcast at a power of 5W instead of the previous 2W of Class B "CS".
 Base station Shore-based AIS transceiver (transmit and receive) which operates using SOTDMA. Base stations have a complex set of features and functions which in the AIS standard are able to control the AIS system and all devices operating therein. Ability to interrogate individual transceivers for status reports and or transmit frequency changes.
 Aids to navigation (AtoN) Shore- or buoy-based transceiver (transmit and receive) which operates using fixed-access time-division multiple-access (FATDMA). Designed to collect and transmit data related to sea and weather conditions as well as relay AIS messages to extend network coverage.
 Search and rescue transceiver (SART) Specialist AIS device created as an emergency distress beacon which operates using pre-announce time-division multiple-access (PATDMA), or sometimes called a "modified SOTDMA". The device randomly selects a slot to transmit and will transmit a burst of eight messages per minute to maximize the probability of successful transmission. A SART is required to transmit up to a maximum of five miles and transmits a special message format recognised by other AIS devices. The device is designed for periodic use and only in emergencies due to its PATDMA-type operation which places stress on the slot map.
 Specialist AIS transceivers Despite there being IMO/IEC published AIS specifications, a number of authorities have permitted and encouraged the development of hybrid AIS devices. These devices seek to maintain the integrity of the core AIS transmission structure and design to ensure operational reliability, but to add a range of additional features and functions to suit their specific requirements. The "Identifier" AIS transceiver is one such product where the core Class B CSTDMA technology is designed to ensure that the device transmits in complete compliance with the IMO specifications, but a number of changes have been made to enable it to be battery powered, low cost and more easy to install and deploy in large numbers. Such devices will not have international certification against an IMO specification since they will comply with a proportion of the relevant specification. Typically authorities will make their own detailed technical evaluation and test to ensure that the core operation of the device does not harm the international AIS system.

AIS receivers are not specified in the AIS standards, because they do not transmit. The main threat to the integrity of any AIS system are non-compliant AIS transmissions, hence careful specifications of all transmitting AIS devices. However, it is well to note that AIS transceivers all transmit on multiple channels as required by the AIS standards. Consequently, single-channel or multiplexed receivers will not receive all AIS messages. Only dual-channel receivers will receive all AIS messages.

Type testing and approval
AIS is a technology which has been developed under the auspices of the IMO by its technical committees. The technical committees have developed and published a series of AIS product specifications. Each specification defines a specific AIS product which has been carefully created to work in a precise way with all the other defined AIS devices, thus ensuring AIS system interoperability worldwide. Maintenance of the specification integrity is deemed critical for the performance of the AIS system and the safety of vessels and authorities using the technology. As such most countries require that AIS products are independently tested and certified to comply with a specific published specification. Products that have not been tested and certified by a competent authority, may not conform to the required AIS published specification and therefore may not operate as expected in the field. The most widely recognized and accepted certifications are the R&TTE Directive, the U.S. Federal Communications Commission, and Industry Canada, all of which require independent verification by a qualified and independent testing agency.

Message types
There are 27 different types of top level messages defined in ITU M.1371-5 (out of a possibility of 64) that can be sent by AIS transceivers.

AIS messages 6, 8, 25, and 26 provide "Application Specific Messages" (ASM), that allow "competent authorities" to define additional AIS message subtypes. There are both "addressed" (ABM) and "broadcast" (BBM) variants of the message. Addressed messages, while containing a destination MMSI, are not private and may be decoded by any receiver. 

One of the first uses of ASMs was the Saint Lawrence Seaway use of AIS binary messages (message type 8) to provide information about water levels, lock orders, and weather. The Panama Canal uses AIS type 8 messages to provide information about rain along the canal and wind in the locks.  In 2010, the International Maritime Organization issued Circular 289 that defines the next iteration of ASMs for type 6 and 8 messages. Alexander, Schwehr and Zetterberg proposed that the community of competent authorities work together to maintain a regional register of these messages and their locations of use.  The International Association of Marine Aids to Navigation and Lighthouse Authorities (IALA-AISM) now established a process for collection of regional application-specific messages.

Detailed description: Class A units
Each AIS transceiver consists of one VHF transmitter, two VHF TDMA receivers, one VHF Digital Selective Calling (DSC) receiver, and links to shipboard display and sensor systems via standard marine electronic communications (such as NMEA 0183, also known as IEC 61162).  Timing is vital to the proper synchronization and slot mapping (transmission scheduling) for a Class A unit.  Therefore, every unit is required to have an internal time base, synchronized to a global navigation satellite system (e.g. GPS) receiver.  This internal receiver may also be used for position information.  However, position is typically provided by an external receiver such as GPS, LORAN-C or an inertial navigation system and the internal receiver is only used as a backup for position information.  Other information broadcast by the AIS, if available, is electronically obtained from shipboard equipment through standard marine data connections. Heading information, position (latitude and longitude), "speed over ground", and rate of turn are normally provided by all ships equipped with AIS. Other information, such as destination, and ETA may also be provided.

An AIS transceiver normally works in an autonomous and continuous mode, regardless of whether it is operating in the open seas or coastal or inland areas. AIS transceivers use two different frequencies, VHF maritime channels 87B (161.975 MHz) and 88B (162.025 MHz), and use 9.6 kbit/s Gaussian minimum shift keying (GMSK) modulation over 25 kHz channels using the high-level data link control (HDLC) packet protocol. Although only one radio channel is necessary, each station transmits and receives over two radio channels to avoid interference problems, and to allow channels to be shifted without communications loss from other ships. The system provides for automatic contention resolution between itself and other stations, and communications integrity is maintained even in overload situations.

In order to ensure that the VHF transmissions of different transceivers do not occur at the same time, the signals are time multiplexed using a technology called self-organized time-division multiple access (SOTDMA). The design of this technology is patented, and whether this patent has been waived for use by SOLAS vessels is a matter of debate between the manufacturers of AIS systems and the patent holder, Håkan Lans. Moreover, the United States Patent and Trademark Office (USPTO) canceled all claims in the original patent on March 30, 2010.

In order to make the most efficient use of the bandwidth available, vessels that are anchored or moving slowly transmit less frequently than those that are moving faster or are maneuvering. The update rate ranges from 3 minutes for anchored or moored vessels, to 2 seconds for fast moving or maneuvering vessels, the latter being similar to that of conventional marine radar.

Each AIS station determines its own transmission schedule (slot), based upon data link traffic history and an awareness of probable future actions by other stations. A position report from one station fits into one of 2,250 time slots established every 60 seconds on each frequency. AIS stations continuously synchronize themselves to each other, to avoid overlap of slot transmissions. Slot selection by an AIS station is randomized within a defined interval and tagged with a random timeout of between 4 and 8 minutes. When a station changes its slot assignment, it announces both the new location and the timeout for that location. In this way new stations, including those stations which suddenly come within radio range close to other vessels, will always be received by those vessels.

The required ship reporting capacity according to the IMO performance standard is a minimum of 2,000 time slots per minute, though the system provides 4,500 time slots per minute. The SOTDMA broadcast mode allows the system to be overloaded by 400 to 500% through sharing of slots, and still provides nearly 100% throughput for ships closer than 8 to 10 nmi to each other in a ship to ship mode. In the event of system overload, only targets further away will be subject to drop-out, in order to give preference to nearer targets, which are of greater concern to ship operators. In practice, the capacity of the system is nearly unlimited, allowing for a great number of ships to be accommodated at the same time.

The system coverage range is similar to other VHF applications. The range of any VHF radio is determined by multiple factors, the primary factors are: the height and quality of the transmitting antenna and the height and quality of the receiving antenna. Its propagation is better than that of radar, due to the longer wavelength, so it is possible to reach around bends and behind islands if the land masses are not too high. The look-ahead distance at sea is nominally . With the help of repeater stations, the coverage for both ship and VTS stations can be improved considerably.

The system is backward compatible with digital selective calling systems, allowing shore-based GMDSS systems to inexpensively establish AIS operating channels and identify and track AIS-equipped vessels, and is intended to fully replace existing DSC-based transceiver systems.

Shore-based AIS network systems are now being built up around the world. One of the biggest fully operational, real time systems with full routing capability is in China. This system was built between 2003 and 2007 and was delivered by Saab TranspondereTech. The entire Chinese coastline is covered with approximately 250 base stations in hot-standby configurations including 70 computer servers in three main regions. Hundreds of shore-based users, including about 25 vessel traffic service (VTS) centers, are connected to the network and are able to see the maritime picture, and can also communicate with each ship using SRMs (Safety Related Messages). All data are in real time. The system was designed to improve the safety and security of ships and port facilities. It is also designed according to an SOA architecture with socket based connection and using IEC AIS standardized protocol all the way to the VTS users. The base stations have hot-standby units (IEC 62320-1) and the network is the third generation network solution.

By the beginning of 2007, a new worldwide standard for AIS base stations was approved, the IEC 62320-1 standard. The old IALA recommendation and the new IEC 62320-1 standard are in some functions incompatible, and therefore attached network solutions have to be upgraded. This will not affect users, but system builders need to upgrade software to accommodate the new standard. A standard for AIS base stations has been long-awaited. Currently ad-hoc networks exist with class A mobiles. Base stations can control the AIS message traffic in a region, which will hopefully reduce the number of packet collisions.

Broadcast information
An AIS transceiver sends the following data every 2 to 10 seconds depending on a vessel's speed while underway, and every 3 minutes while a vessel is at anchor:

 Vessel Maritime Mobile Service Identity (MMSI): a unique nine digit identification number.
 Navigation status: E.g., "at anchor", "under way using engine(s)", "not under command", etc.
 Rate of turn: right or left, from 0 to 720 degrees per minute
 Speed over ground:  resolution from 0 to 
 Positional resolution:
 Longitude: to  arcminutes
 Latitude: to  arcminutes
 Course over ground: relative to true north to 0.1°
 True heading: 0 to 359° (for example from a gyro compass)
 True bearing at own position: 0 to 359°
 UTC seconds: The seconds field of the UTC time when these data were generated.  A complete timestamp is not present.

In addition, the following data are broadcast every 6 minutes:
 IMO ship identification number: a seven digit number that remains unchanged upon transfer of the ship's registration to another country
 Radio call sign: international radio call sign, up to 7 characters, assigned to the vessel by its country of registry
 Name: 20 characters to represent the name of the vessel
 Type of ship/cargo
 Dimensions of ship, to nearest meter
 Location of positioning system's (e.g., GPS) antenna on board the vessel: in meters aft of bow and meters port or starboard
 Type of positioning system: such as GPS, DGPS or LORAN-C.
 Draught of ship: 0.1–25.5 meters
 Destination: max. 20 characters
 ETA (estimated time of arrival) at destination: UTC month/date hour:minute
 Optional: high precision time request, a vessel can request other vessels provide a high precision UTC time and datestamp

Detailed description: Class B units
Class B transceivers are smaller, simpler and lower cost than Class A transceivers. Each consists of one VHF transmitter, two VHF Carrier Sense Time Division Multiple Access (CSTDMA) receivers, both alternating as the VHF Digital Selective Calling (DSC) receiver, and a GPS active antenna. Although the data output format supports heading information, in general units are not interfaced to a compass, so this data is seldom transmitted. Output is the standard AIS data stream at 38.400 kbit/s, as RS-232 and/or NMEA formats. To prevent overloading of the available bandwidth, transmission power is restricted to 2 W, giving a range of about 5–10 mi.

Four messages are defined for class B units:

 Message 14 Safety Related Message: This message is transmitted on request for the user – some transceivers have a button that enables it to be sent, or it can be sent through the software interface. It sends a pre-defined safety message.
 Message 18 Standard Class B CS Position Report: This message is sent every 3 minutes where speed over ground (SOG) is less than 2 knots, or every 30 seconds for greater speeds. MMSI, time, SOG, COG, longitude, latitude, true heading
 Message 19 Extended Class B Equipment Position Report: This message was designed for the SOTDMA protocol, and is too long to be transmitted as CSTDMA. However a coast station can poll the transceiver for this message to be sent. MMSI, time, SOG, COG, longitude, latitude, true heading, ship type, dimensions.
 Message 24 Class B CS Static Data Report: This message is sent every 6 minutes, the same time interval as for Class A transponders. Because of its length, this message is divided into two parts, sent within one minute of each other. This message was defined after the original AIS specifications, so some Class A units may need a firmware upgrade to be able to decode this message. MMSI, boat name, ship type, call sign, dimensions, and equipment vendor id.

Detailed description: AIS receivers
A number of manufacturers offer AIS receivers, designed for monitoring AIS traffic. These may have two receivers, for monitoring both frequencies simultaneously, or they may switch between frequencies (thereby missing messages on the other channel, but at reduced price). In general they will output RS-232, NMEA, USB or UDP data for display on electronic chart plotters or computers. As well as dedicated radios, software defined radios can be set up to receive the signal.

Technical specification

RF characteristics 
AIS uses the globally allocated Marine Band channels 87 and 88.

AIS uses the high side of the duplex from two VHF radio "channels" (87B) and (88B)
 Channel A 161.975 MHz (87B) 
 Channel B 162.025 MHz (88B)

The simplex channels 87A and 88A use a lower frequency so they are not affected by this allocation and can still be used as designated for the maritime mobile frequency plan.

Most AIS transmissions are composed of bursts of several messages. In these cases, between messages, the AIS transmitter must change channel.

Before being transmitted, AIS messages must be non-return-to-zero inverted (NRZI) encoded.

AIS messages are transmitted using Gaussian minimum-shift keying (GMSK) modulation. The GMSK modulator BT-product used for transmission of data should be 0.4 maximum (highest nominal value).

The GMSK coded data should frequency modulate the VHF transmitter. The modulation index should be 0.5.

The transmission bit rate is 9600bit/s

Ordinary VHF receivers can receive AIS with the filtering disabled (the filtering destroys the GMSK data). However, the audio output from the radio would need to be then decoded. There are several PC applications that can do this.

The signal can travel a maximum of 75 kilometers

Message organization 
As there are a multitude of automatic equipment transmitting AIS messages, to avoid conflict, the RF space is organized in frames. Each frame lasts exactly 1 minute and starts on each minute boundary. Each frame is divided into 2250 slots. As transmission can happen on 2 channels, there are 4500 available slots per minute. Depending on the type and status of equipment and the status of the AIS slot map, each AIS transmitter will send out messages using one of the following schemes:

 Incremental time division multiple access (ITDMA)
 Random access time division multiple access (RATDMA)
 Fixed access time division multiple access (FATDMA)
 Self-organizing time division multiple access (SOTDMA)

The ITDMA access scheme allows a device to pre-announce transmission slots of non-repeatable character, ITDMA slots should be marked so that they are reserved for one additional frame. This allows a device to pre-announce its allocations for autonomous and continuous operation.

ITDMA is used on three occasions:
 data link network entry;
 temporary changes and transitions in periodical reporting intervals;
 pre-announcement of safety related messages.

RATDMA is used when a device needs to allocate a slot, which has not been pre-announced. This is generally done for the first transmission slot, or for messages of a non-repeatable character.

FATDMA is used by base stations only. FATDMA allocated slots are used for repetitive messages.

SOTDMA is used by mobile devices operating in autonomous and continuous mode. The purpose of the access scheme is to offer an access algorithm which quickly resolves conflicts without intervention from
controlling stations.

Message format 
An AIS slot is 26.66 ms long. The data modulation is 9600 bit/s, so each slot has a maximum capacity of 256 bits. The framing is derived from the HDLC standard, described in ISO/IEC 13239:2002.

Each slot is structured as such:
 <8 bit ramp up><24 bit preamble><8 bit start flag><168 bit payload><16 bit CRC><8 bit stop flag><24 bit buffer>

 24 bit preamble: this is a sequence of 0101...
 Start flag: 0x7e
 168 bit payload, this is the body of an AIS message. For messages requiring more data, several slots (Maximum of 5) must be used.
 16 bit CRC-16-CCITT: 16-bit polynomial to calculate the checksum.
 Stop flag: 0x7e
 24 bit buffer used for bit stuffing, synchronization jitter and distance delay.

Note that the signal on the VHF carrier is NRZI encoded and uses bit-stuffing to avoid unintentional stop-flags which may otherwise occur in the data. As such, the raw bits must first be decoded, and the stuffing bits removed, to arrive at the actual usable message format described above.

Messages

Messages sent and received over the air 

All AIS messages transmit 3 basic elements of information:
 The MMSI number of the ship or equipment that holds the transmitter (base station, buoy, etc.)
 The identification of the message being transmitted (See below table)
 A repeat indicator that was designed to be used for repeating messages over obstacles by relay devices.

The following table gives a summary of all the currently used AIS messages.

Messages sent to other equipment in the ship 
AIS equipment exchange information with other equipment using NMEA 0183 sentences.

The NMEA 0183 standard uses two primary sentences for AIS data
 !AIVDM (received data from other vessels)
 !AIVDO (own vessel's information)

Typical NMEA 0183 standard AIS message: !AIVDM,1,1,,A,14eG;o@034o8sd<L9i:a;WF>062D,0*7D

In order: 
!AIVDM:        The NMEA message type, other NMEA device messages are restricted  
1              Number of sentences (some messages need more than one, maximum generally is 9) 
1              Sentence number (1 unless it is a multi-sentence message) 
               The blank is the sequential message ID (for multi-sentence messages) 
A              The AIS channel (A or B), for dual channel transponders it must match the channel used 
14eG;...       The encoded AIS data, using AIS-ASCII6 
0*             End of data, number of unused bits at end of encoded data (0-5)
7D             NMEA checksum (NMEA 0183 Standard CRC16)

Security
AIS was designed as an intentionally open standard and due to the unauthenticated and unencrypted nature of AIS, recently Balduzzi, Pasta, Wilhoit et al. showed that AIS is vulnerable to different threats like spoofing, hijacking and availability disruption. These threats affect both the implementation in online providers and the protocol specification, which make the problems relevant to all transponder installations (estimated at 300,000+).

Publicly available ship monitoring websites rely on largely unauthenticated data feeds from volunteer-operated AIS receiver network, whose messages can be relatively easily faked by means of injecting AIS packets into the raw data stream, or on-air using slightly more complex equipment such as SDR. Ship-to-ship communications are however sent by Class B transponders which are certified to only supply GPS position from integrated receiver, so circumventing these messages would require SDR or GPS spoofing.

Spoofing
On 18 June 2021 AIS receivers in Chornomorsk, Ukraine, reported HMS Defender and HNLMS Evertsen allegedly sailing towards Sevastopol Russian military base in annexed Crimea while the ships were safely moored in Odessa, according to numerous live port webcam feeds and witnesses, which implied that falsified AIS data was injected into the system by an unknown party. A few days later, on 22–23 June, the ships left Odessa and indeed sailed by the Crimean coast, with Russia accusing the fleet of violating its territory while UK command insisted the ships sailed in international waters.

In March 2021 a similar incident was registered by Swedish armed forces whose ships were incorrectly presented by AIS as if they were sailing in Russian waters near Kaliningrad.

In July 2021, researcher Bjorn Bergman found almost 100 sets of faked AIS data between September 2020 and August 2021, with almost all of those being faked NATO and European warships.  He said that the data appeared in the system as if it had been received by ground (not satellite) receivers, which led him to believe that the data is not being introduced by fake radio transmissions, but rather injected into the data streams used by AIS websites.  Todd Humphreys, director of the Radionavigation Laboratory at the University of Texas at Austin, stated that "While I can't say for sure who's doing this, the data fits a pattern of disinformation that our Russian friends are wont to engage in."

Research 
There is a growing body of literature on methods of exploiting AIS data for safety and optimisation of seafaring, namely traffic analysis, anomaly detection, route extraction and prediction, collision detection, path planning, weather routing, atmospheric refractivity estimation and many more

See also
 ADS-B, a conceptually similar system for aircraft
 AIS-SART, a handheld search and rescue system
 Automatic Packet Reporting System
 Long-range identification and tracking (ships)
 MarineTraffic, a site that utilizes AIS data
 NMEA 0183
 Sea traffic management
 Traffic collision avoidance system, (TCAS) for aircraft

References

External links
 AIS Currents & Ocean Dynamics 2.0 ocean current mapping resources by e-Odyn
 AIS research resources a list of references
 AllAboutAIS.com a general explanation of AIS and terms
 US Coast Guard a general explanation of AIS and terms
 VTMiS information International Maritime SAR Safety and Security Consultancy vessel information services
 Todays AIS systems and which to choose for which vessel Today's AIS systems what types of vessels need AIS and which should be used.
 AIS Data Monitor a free tool to inspect AIS data messages
 VesselFinder

Electronic navigation
Navigational equipment
Maritime communication
Maritime safety
Technology systems
Water transport
Navigational aids
Articles containing video clips
Geographic position